Irbe is a Latvian feminine name and surname.

Irbe may also refer to:

Irbe River, Latvia
Irbe Strait, Baltic Sea

See also